Roșcani may refer to several places:

In Moldova:
Roșcani, Anenii Noi, a commune in Anenii Noi district
Roșcani, Strășeni, a commune in Strășeni district
 Roșcani, a village in Pereni Commune, Rezina district
 Roșcanii de Jos and Roșcanii de Sus, villages in Ghiduleni Commune, Rezina district

In Romania:
Roșcani, Iași, a commune in Iaşi County
 Roșcani, a village in Băneasa Commune, Galați County
 Roșcani, a village in Dobra Commune, Hunedoara County
 Roșcani, a village administered by Liteni town, Suceava County
 Roșcani (river), a tributary of the Chineja in Galați County

See also 
 Rosca (disambiguation)